S. Rajendran is a former MLA from Kovilpatti (state assembly constituency) in Tamil Nadu, India, elected in  Assembly election 2001.

Assembly election 2001

References

Communist Party of India politicians from Tamil Nadu
Members of the Tamil Nadu Legislative Assembly
Year of birth missing (living people)
Living people